Aloeides dentatis, the Roodepoort copper, is a species of butterfly in the family Lycaenidae. It is found in Lesotho and South Africa.

The wingspan is 22–26 mm for males and 24–28 mm females. Adults are on wing from August to November and from February to March. There are two generations per year.

The larvae of the nominate subspecies feed on Hermannia depressa and Lotononis eriantha. Larvae of subspecies A. d. maseruna feed on Hermannia jacobeifolia. The larvae are attended to by Lepisiota capensis ants.

Subspecies
Aloeides dentatis dentatis (South Africa: Mpumalanga, Gauteng, KwaZulu-Natal)
Aloeides dentatis maseruna (Riley, 1938) (Lesotho, South Africa: North West and Free State)

References

Butterflies described in 1909
Aloeides
Taxonomy articles created by Polbot